The fifth election to the Llandeilo Rural District Council was held in March 1907. It was preceded by the 1904 election and followed by the 1910 election. The successful candidates were also elected to the Llandeilo Board of Guardians.

There were a number of unopposed returns, especially in the rural parishes.

Ward Results

Bettws (three seats)

Brechfa (one seat)

Glynamman (one seat)

Llandebie (two seats)

Llandebie, Blaenau (two seats)

Llandeilo Fawr North Ward (three seats)

Llandeilo Fawr South Ward (two seats)

Llandyfeisant (one seat)

Llanegwad (three seats)

Llanfihangel Aberbythych (two seats)

Llanfihangel Cilfragen (one seat)

Llanfynydd (two seats)

Llangathen (two seats)

Llansawel (two seats)

Quarter Bach No.1 (one seat)

Quarter Bach No.2 (one seat)

Talley (two seats)

Llandeilo Board of Guardians

All members of the District Council also served as members of Llandeilo Board of Guardians. In addition, three Guardians were elected to represent the Ammanford Urban District which was established in 1903. A further three Guardians were elected to represent the Llandeilo Urban District.

Ammanford (three seats)
The three sitting members, including Henry Herbert, a Guardian for nearly twenty years, were re-elected.

Llandeilo (three seats)

References

1907 Welsh local elections
Elections in Carmarthenshire
20th century in Carmarthenshire